Park Ye-rin (born 29 April 2000) is a South Korean swimmer. In 2018, she won the bronze medal in the mixed 4 × 100 metre medley relay event at the 2018 Asian Games held in Jakarta, Indonesia.

In 2017, she won the silver medal in the women's short course 50 metre butterfly event and the bronze medal in the women's short course 100 metre butterfly event at the 2017 Asian Indoor and Martial Arts Games held in Ashgabat, Turkmenistan.

In 2019, she represented South Korea at the 2019 World Aquatics Championships held in Gwangju, South Korea. She competed in the women's 50 metre butterfly and women's 100 metre butterfly events. She also competed in the women's 4 × 100 metre medley relay and 4 × 100 metre mixed medley relay events.

References

External links
 

Living people
2000 births
Place of birth missing (living people)
South Korean female freestyle swimmers
Swimmers at the 2018 Asian Games
Asian Games bronze medalists for South Korea
Medalists at the 2018 Asian Games
Asian Games medalists in swimming
21st-century South Korean women